Voodoo Dice is an action puzzle game produced by French studio Exkee and distributed by Ubisoft on Xbox Live Arcade, PlayStation Network, and WiiWare. In Voodoo Dice, the player rolls dice through a path containing barriers, switches, conveyors and trap doors. The game consists of 60 single-player levels and 20 multiplayer levels. There are four multiplayer play modes (arcade, race mode, flag mode, tactic mode). In single-player mode, the player must finish each level within a set time limit in order to win achievements.

Reception

The PlayStation 3, Wii, and Xbox 360 versions received "mixed or average reviews" according to the review aggregation website Metacritic.

Since its release, the Xbox 360 version sold 3,152 units worldwide as of January 2011. Sales had moved up to 5,576 units by the end of 2011.

References

External links
 

2010 video games
IOS games
PlayStation 3 games
PlayStation Network games
PlayStation Portable games
Puzzle video games
Ubisoft games
Video games developed in France
WiiWare games
Windows games
Xbox 360 games
Xbox 360 Live Arcade games